Chernihiv (U310) was a  of the Ukrainian Navy captured by the Russian Navy when the Black Sea Fleet seized Ukraine's Southern Naval Base, during the 2014 Crimean crisis.

History
Minesweeper Zenitchik was built in the Sredne-Nevskiy SS3 shipbuilding yard in Leningrad in 1974. The ship was deployed on combat tours in Persian Gulf, Red Sea and the Atlantic between 1977 and 1988.

During the partition of the Black Sea Fleet, the minesweeper was transferred to Ukrainian Navy on July 25, 1997. It was renamed Zhovti Vody (U310), in honor of the Battle of Zhovti Vody. On June 18, 2004 the minesweeper was renamed Chernihiv.

References

Chernihiv
1974 ships
Cold War minesweepers of the Soviet Union
Ships built in the Soviet Union
Minesweepers of the Ukrainian Navy
Captured ships
Natya-class minesweepers
Vessels captured from the Ukrainian Navy
Minesweepers of the Russian Navy
Annexation of Crimea by the Russian Federation
Ships involved in the Russo-Ukrainian War